Benfleet may refer to:

Places in England
Benfleet railway station, Essex
Benfleet Urban District, a former urban district in Essex
North Benfleet, a village in the Basildon district of Essex
South Benfleet, a town in the borough of Castle Point, Essex

Other uses
Benfleet F.C., a football club based in Benfleet, Essex